Girlfriends is an American sitcom television series that premiered on September 11, 2000, on UPN and aired on UPN's successor network, The CW, before being cancelled in 2008. The final episode aired on February 11, 2008.

Episodes

Broadcast history
The series debuted on UPN on Monday September 11, 2000. After airing for several years on the network at 9/8C on Mondays, The CW moved Girlfriends to Sundays at 8/7C. After this, the ratings plummeted. On October 9, 2006, Girlfriends, along with The CW's other African-American  programs, moved back to Mondays. At this point, Girlfriends returned to its original time slot.

While UPN was still airing new episodes of Girlfriends, the network also began airing reruns five days per week. When the show moved to The CW network after UPN merged with The WB network, MyNetwork TV (which was created to take over UPN's former affiliate stations) picked up the rights to air reruns of Girlfriends, although they eventually discontinued running them. WE tv, a network primarily focused on women's programming, later acquired exclusive rights to air the limited-release episodes on Sundays and exercised an option to not allow broadcast television networks re-broadcast rights to these reruns.

Due to the 2007–08 Writers Guild of America strike, the last episodes produced aired on February 11, 2008. The CW had announced plans to move the series to Sunday nights. However, it was later announced on February 13, 2008 that the series was cancelled after 8 seasons and a proper series finale would not be produced. A representative from The CW stated that the network was going to cancel the series due to low ratings and that it would have been too expensive to re-enter production.

A retrospective episode was in development to conclude the series but was later scrapped. The network had offered the actors only half of their usual episodic salary to take part, and the actors collectively turned the offer down.

Characters

Main
 Joan Carol Clayton, Esq: (played by Tracee Ellis Ross) is considered the unofficial "den mother" of the group, as she frequently looks out for her friends even at the expense of dealing with her own problems, which are plentiful throughout the series. Originally from Fresno, Joan owns a home in the Wilton Historic District Joan met Toni when they were children and then met Lynn in college, and Maya is her assistant at the law firm. She has always had relationship problems and gave up her law career to pursue her dreams. She and Toni clash several times throughout the series, resulting in ending and reconciling their friendship. Major incidents involved Joan inadvertently revealing Toni's cheating to Greg, and Joan's jealousy of Toni's marriage to Todd, but their friendship officially ends by the end of Season 6 when Joan fails to appear for Toni's custody hearing. For much of Season 7, Joan mourned the loss of her friendship with Toni, eventually opting to resent and belittle her in front of the group. At the end of Season 7, she became engaged to Aaron Waters, whom she met while rehabilitating homes in New Orleans damaged by Hurricane Katrina; she moved into his home, in West Adams, Los Angeles, while Aaron was deployed to Iraq and rented her house to Lynn. 
 Maya Denise Wilkes (née Woods): (played by Golden Brooks) is a former assistant to Joan and a housewife/author. Maya grew up in Compton, California and is married to her high school sweetheart, Darnell (played by Flex Alexander). They have one child, Jabari. Maya is the youngest and sassiest of the group, and is often at odds with Toni over her ego-driven lifestyle. She is a devoted wife and mother, and is frequently depicted with stronger religious and moral convictions. Maya is the most "working-class" member of the group, especially in earlier seasons. In the first few seasons Maya was more obviously "from the hood", with the associated stereotyped speech and mannerisms. However, as she becomes more successful in her career and interacts more extensively with the legal and publishing industries, she exhibits fewer stereotypes; while still obviously from a different social background as the rest of the group, she is no longer as caricatured. In the early seasons, Maya's marriage to Darnell imploded after she had an emotional affair with an acquaintance. Later, after she launches a career as a self-help author, they reunite. In Season 8, the couple endured a miscarriage and later explored the possibility of adopting a baby girl. Over the course of the series, Maya lived in South Central Los Angeles, Leimert Park, and finally bought her dream home with Darnell in Lancaster. At the end of Season 7, Maya and Darnell sell their home in Lancaster and move to West Adams, Los Angeles.
 Lynn Ann Searcy: (played by Persia White) was Joan and Toni's roommate at UCLA and lived with Joan for eight years before the series begins. Lynn holds five post-graduate degrees. Born in Virginia to a black father and a bipolar white mother from a wealthy family, Lynn was adopted by a white family in Seattle (her dad affectionately calls her "Noodle"). She did not embrace her black heritage until college. When Joan decides it is time for Lynn to move out of her home, Lynn reluctantly becomes more independent by taking on various, mostly menial jobs. She previously lived with Toni, William, Maya, and Sivad (temporarily); and shared a garage with then-boyfriend Vosco before moving into her own apartment (after becoming a property manager at the complex where Maya lived). She produces a documentary on the HIV/AIDS pandemic, focusing on African-American women. While Lynn is depicted as the most sexually adventurous one of the group (with frequent mentions of one-night stands, group sex, sex toys, and her infamous "Lynn Spin"), she also dates frequently. She is most attracted to artistic and spiritual men, and over the course of the series has relationships with a Jamaican immigrant, a poet, a pastor, and a musician named Finn (the recording artist Tricky). She was also briefly married to William. Her romantic involvement with Lenny (who was so similar to Lynn that the others labeled him as her "brother") was the catalyst for her to search for her biological father. After dating Finn, she discovers that music is her passion, and starts a band called Indigo Skye. Lynn is often considered the bohemian of the group, with her carefree nature and down-to-earth personality, and is a vegan. By Season 8, she had signed with "Dirty Girl" Records.
 Antoinette "Toni" Marie Childs-Garrett: (played by Jill Marie Jones, Seasons 1–6) has been Joan's friend since they were eight-years-old, they attended elementary, high school, and college together. Toni grew up on poor on a farm with an alcoholic mother in Fresno, California. Toni is considered the shallow and popular one of the girlfriends and is the self-proclaimed "cute one" of the group. During the first season Toni and Maya don't get along (she considered Maya to be a lower-class intruder), but ultimately embraced her friendship. Toni is a real-estate agent who eventually opens her own brokerage. She rekindles her romance with Greg Sparks (the "love of her life"), but he dumps her when he learns she cheated on him with Dr. Clay Spencer. Toni unexpectedly finds love with Todd Garrett, a white, Jewish plastic surgeon, whom she marries after a short courtship. After a rocky year-long marriage, the two separate after Todd moves to New York. Toni and Todd have a baby named Morgan. They fight over custody, but at the end of the 6th season work out their issues. Joan misses the custody hearing leading to the fight that ultimately ends Toni and Joan's friendship. Toni moves to New York City so Morgan can be closer to Todd, but has maintained her friendships with Maya and Lynn. Toni's condo was located in Hollywood Hancock Park.
 William Jerrowme Dent, Esq: (played by Reggie Hayes) is the girls' closest male friend. He is senior partner at Goldberg, Swedelson, McDonald and Lee. Hailing from Kansas City, Missouri he is portrayed as somewhat of a "mama's boy", but possesses self-confidence and a dry sense of humor. (One episode focused on his distant and complicated relationship with his father, who is a perfectionist.) After being left at the wedding altar by the woman he loved and police officer, Yvonne Blackwell, he reluctantly gets back into the groove of dating, including Donna, Kara, senior partner Sharon Upton Farley (played by Anne-Marie Johnson), and the at-times the vicious Monica Charles Brooks (whom he ultimately marries). Fearing that Joan would beat him to the altar, he eloped with Lynn on a whim; though he quickly realized that he wanted to find true love and they ultimately divorce. He later realizes that Joan is the right woman for him, but after three months of courting, the two end their relationship. He became a sperm donor for his sister Linda and her same-sex partner, and regards the baby as his "nephew-son." He is also co-owner of the J-Spot restaurant with Joan. In later seasons, William forges a tight bond with Darnell, Maya's husband. During Season 7, he was working on his marriage with Monica. According to William's mother, his middle name is spelled with two "R"s, and a silent "W". Beginning in season 2, William owns a home in the Valley.
 Darnell Leroy Wilkes: (played by Flex Alexander Season 1, and then played by Khalil Kain, Seasons 6–8, main; 2–5, recurring) is Maya's husband. He and Maya married at a young age and had their son, Jabari. Darnell was an airport baggage handler, before becoming a mechanic at a local car repair shop. For a while, he was a NASCAR pit crew mechanic. After Maya's affair with Stan Wright the two divorce. In earlier seasons, he felt threatened by Maya's friendship with Joan, Toni and Lynn; though he ultimately put his issues aside and became friends with them. After the divorce, he dated a woman named Lena (Chenoa Maxwell) whom Maya disliked because she still had feelings for Darnell. At Lena and Darnell's wedding Maya professed her love for Darnell. The two reconcile and begin living together again in Season 6. In the end of Season 7, Darnell accepts an offer to buy back his garage and get Maya and Jabari a new house in Los Angeles. After suffering a miscarriage, the couple considers adopting a baby girl. 
 Monica Charles Brooks-Dent: (played by Keesha Sharp, Seasons 7–8, main; 3–6, recurring) is William's wife. All four of the girlfriends (especially Lynn and Toni) hated her (Joan comes to see her vulnerable side and becomes her friend, and Toni moves to New York City at the end of the sixth season). In the seventh season, the girls slowly and later fully accept Monica as their friend as Monica does the same. Although engaged to William, the two date twice before; they meet at a bar the first time. Since the last time William proposes to her in Monaco, he has occasionally had doubts about ever doing so. Eventually William and Monica get married, but on their wedding day he has too much to drink and confesses that he has had and still has doubts about marrying her. Monica leaves William in Season 7, but returns shortly after the girlfriends go to Chicago to persuade her to get back together with William. On their visit, the girls discover that Monica, due to her father's dementia and her mother's power of attorney, has been cut off from her family fortune, so Joan offers Monica a job at the J-Spot. William is thrilled about Monica's return until she demands half of what he earned while they were married. They manage to slowly rebuild their relationship but constantly clash at the J-Spot. In the Season 7 finale, Monica and William get back together. By Season 8, Monica was pregnant and is seen spending more time with the other three girlfriends, particularly Joan.

Recurring
 Jabari Darnell Wilkes: (Seasons 1–6 played by: Tanner Scott Richards, Season 7–8 played by: Kendré Berry) is Maya and Darnell's son. He was born when Maya was 16 years old. He was depicted to be a sweet innocent child but once he entered his teen years he seemed to be a little more dimwitted and rebellious.
 Jeanette Woods: (played by Charmin Lee) is Maya's no-nonsense mother who won't hesitate to put a switch to her adult daughter. She babysat Jabari while he was younger, and also rented out her garage for Lynn and her then-boyfriend Vosco, from Jamaica, to live after Joan kicked her out of her house. She initially took an instant dislike to Joan's "sadiddy" behavior towards Maya's style (also labeling Joan as "classist" and "egregious" as Maya does), but eventually grew to accept her. She and Maya also butt heads when she decides to sell her home to move in with her boyfriend Earl (whom Maya doesn't like). Jeanette was seen throughout Seasons 1–7.
 Veretta Childs: (played by Jenifer Lewis) is Toni's loud and outspoken mother from Fresno whose high-spirited behavior and garish outfits often embarrass Toni.  She suffered from alcoholism during Toni's formative years, which put a strain on their relationship.  Veretta eventually sobered up. However, she briefly relapsed during Toni and Todd's engagement party - this was partially due to her guilt over her daughters Toni and Sherri not getting along.  While she and Toni often clash, she supports her daughter.  Veretta appears throughout Seasons 2-6.  
 Ronnie: (played by Lamont Johnson) is Maya's cousin and hair stylist. In the series he helped sell her semi-biographical book. He owns two beauty salons called Situations and Situations Deux. He is last seen at the ending of season 7 as Aaron proposed to Joan.
 Peaches: (played by Shawn Harrison) Ronnie's boyfriend who is a hair stylist at Situations and had a short stint as Joan's assistant and temporary confidante after Maya goes to work as William's secretary after William becomes Senior Partner. Peaches is last seen at the ending of season 7 as Aaron proposes to Joan. Peaches also made a cameo in a season 2 episode of Eve.
Sherri Childs: (played by Yvette Nicole Brown) Toni's oldest sister who she does not get along with due to Toni leaving the family due to their mother's alcoholism to go to school. They reconcile their relationship in the episode where Toni gets married to Todd. She, alongside Lynn, Maya and Melanie (Toni's other sister) were a part of her ceremony as her bridesmaids. She appears in two episodes in season 3.
 Davis Hamilton: (played by Randy J. Goodwin) owner and operator of the girls' favorite restaurant/hangout spot, 847 (Season 1). He and Joan flirted with one another, and almost went away for a romantic weekend while both were involved with other people. However, during Season 4, in the aftermath of Joan's breakup with Brock, she runs into Davis at a movie theater. She learns that Davis had lost the restaurant and also ended his relationship with his fiancée'. They talk about how they missed the opportunity to start a relationship, and ultimately decide to just remain friends.
 Charles Swedelson: (played by Phil Reeves) the managing partner at Goldberg, Swedelson, McDonald and Lee who is also Joan's and William's supervisor. Though highly professional, he is known to have a roving eye for the ladies, and tends to use "hip-hop" and "urban" euphemisms towards Joan and William to appear more laid back and sociable. Mr. Swedelson was seen throughout the entire series run.
 Yvonne Blackwell (pronounced Yuh Von): (played by Cee Cee Michaela) William's girlfriend, later fiancée in the first two seasons. Yvonne originally was a crazy police officer that William met on the internet and went on a date in the Season 1 episode, "Hip-Ocracy" but Yvonne and William start dating midway through the first season and later get engaged at the beginning of Season 2. Yvonne quits the police force after her life was put on the line and after William issued her an ultimatum. During Season 2, Yvonne and William have some issues in their relationship mainly because William bought a house unbeknownst to Yvonne. Later in the episode, "Willie or Won't He II: The Last Chapter?", Yvonne and William get married but she leaves William at the altar after confessing the many issues happening in their relationship.
 Jason Pace as Dr. Todd Garrett (Seasons 3-6) A Jewish Beverly Hills Doctor that Toni later marries. He first appeared in the Season 3 episode “Secrets and Eyes”

Guest appearances

 Adrian Lester; Ellis Carter 
 Aldis Hodge; Matthew Miles  & Derwin Davis 
 Angie Stone; Darla Mason 
 Anne-Marie Johnson; Sharon Upton Farley 
 Bebe Moore Campbell; Herself 
 Bernard Parks; Himself 
 Bernie Casey; Edward Dent 
 Bern Nadette Stanis; Herself 
 Beverly Johnson; Herself 
 Big Boi; Himself 
 CCH Pounder; Dr. Myers 
 Cee Cee Michaela Harshaw; Yvonne Blackwell 
 Car'ynn Sims; Chevonne Brown 
 Chante Moore; Herself 
 Charnele Brown; Beverly 
 Christina Vidal; Samantha Stephens 
 Chrisette Michele; Herself 
 Christopher Darden; Himself 
 Chuma Hunter-Gault; Greg Sparks 
 Cindy Williams; Lisa 
 Common; Omar 
 Coby Bell; Jason Pitts 
 Danny Bonaduce; Himself 
 Darius McCrary; Antoine Childs 
 David Groh; Michael Goldberg 
 David Ramsey; Randall Potter 
 Dawn Wells; Herself 
 Dawnn Lewis; Linda Dent 
 Demond Wilson; Kenneth Miles 
 Dondre T. Whitfield; Sean Ellis 
 Donnie McClurkin; Himself 
 Don Franklin; Stan 
 Doug Spearman; Man 
 Drew Sidora; Sage 
 Duane Martin; Preston C. Hall 
 Erykah Badu; Herself 
 Evan Ross; Himself 
 Harry Lennix; Earl 
 Hosea Chanchez; Malik Wright 
 Isaac Hayes; Eugene Childs 
 Idris Elba; Paul 
 Jackie Collins; Herself 
 James L. Avery Sr.; Dr. Couch 
 Jenifer Lewis; Veretta Childs 
 Jennifer Baxter; Kelly Pitts 
 Jill Scott; Donna Williams 
 Joan Pringle; Carol Clayton 
 Joe Torry; Mel 
 Jo Marie Payton; Annette Miles 
 John L. Adams; Vosco 
 John Salley; Byron 
 Jonelle Allen; Eleanor Charles 
 Kadeem Hardison; Eldon Parks 
 Karen Austin; Sandy Bickle 
 Katt Williams; Rick Beatty 
 Kellie Shanygne Williams; Cecily 
 Kelly Rowland; Tammy 
 Kelsey Grammer; Himself 
 Kenya Moore; Kara 
 Kimberly Elise; Reesie Jackson 
 Kurt Loder; Himself 
 Laila Ali; Herself 
 Laivan Greene; Herself 
 Lawrence Hilton-Jacobs; Leonard James 
 Lil' Zane; Himself 
 Loretta Devine; Judge Vashti Jackson 
 Malik Yoba; Brock Harris 
 Marcia Clark; Herself 
 Master P; Himself 
 Melvin Van Peebles; Kenneth 
 Michael Warren; Bill Clayton 
 Mo'Nique; Herself 
 Orlando Jones; Dr. Lucas 
 Omarosa Manigault-Stallworth; Trina 
 Phil Morris; Dr. Clay Spencer 
 Pooch Hall; Derwin Davis 
 Quddus Phillipe; Xander 
 Reverend Al Sharpton; Himself 
 Richard T. Jones; Aaron 
 Rockmond Dunbar; Jalen 
 Rhonda Ross Kendrick; Laurie (Halloween party guest) 
 Sandra Bernhard; Marcia 
 Saul Williams; Sivad 
 Shar Jackson; Niecy 
 Shanti Lowry; Dionne Marie Taylor 
 Sinbad; Himself 
 Steven Cojocaru; Taz 
 Suzanne de Passe; Herself 
 Tasha Smith; Shandara Duranni 
 Terrell Davis; Himself 
 Terri J. Vaughn; Tasha 
 Tia Mowry; Melanie Barnett 
 Traci Bingham; Candy 
 Tracy Vilar; GiGi 
 Tricky; Finn 
 Una Damon; Myoshi 
 Wayne Brady; Derek Tyler 
 Wendy Raquel Robinson; Tasha Mack 
 Wendell Pierce; Anthony Jackson

Awards and nominations

Spin-off

A 2006 episode of Girlfriends titled "The Game" featured guest star Tia Mowry as Joan's cousin Melanie Barnett, an aspiring medical student, who wants to give up her future to follow her professional athlete boyfriend to San Diego. That episode was the launching pad for The Game, a spin-off series, which was canceled by The CW television network. In April 2010, BET announced that it would pick up the series, which aired new episodes until the August 5, 2015 series finale. When the fourth season of The Game premiered in 2011 it received 7.7 million viewers, which at the time of its airing, made the show the most watched sitcom premiere in cable television history. In November 2021, a revival spin-off of the series was picked up and released to Paramount+, serving as a direct sequel from the original series and was promoted as a refreshed series (rebooted and marketed as season 1) while also subsequently continuing the overall total seasons (chronicled as season 10). The new inception continues where it left off from the 2015 finale a few years later switching gears set in the new location of Las Vegas with the new protagonists of reprised characters, chronicling Tasha Mack and her struggles of being a woman of color sports agent; while her son Malik Wright learns to make important decisions in his sports career while quietly battling mental health issues and Brittany Pitts who is navigating her adult life taking on serious financial hardships and responsibilities becoming independent away from her Pro-Football dads' (Jason Pitts) image and inheritance. The revived series also introduces new characters to the storyline. The reboot has also garnered favorable and positive reviews from media outlets.

Home media

Soundtrack

Track listing
 Erykah Badu - "Vibrate On" (4:14)
 Jill Scott - "Golden" (3:52)
 Angie Stone - "Wish I Didn't Miss You" (4:32)
 Corinne Bailey Rae - "Put Your Records On" (3:35)
 Algebra - "I Know" (3:57)
 Amy Winehouse - "Stronger Than Me" (3:42)
 Estelle - "All Comes Back to You" (3:22)
 Chrisette Michele - "Girl Respect Yourself" (3:44)
 Chaka Khan feat. Mary J. Blige  - "Disrespectful" (4:46)
 India.Arie - "I Am Not My Hair" (3:48)
 Dre - "Soulmate" (4:22)
 Persia White - "Choices" (2:47)
 Lira - "Feel Good" (5:15)

Streaming
The series is available to stream on The CW's free digital-only network, CW Seed. The entire series began streaming on Netflix on September 11, 2020 to commemorate the show's 20th anniversary.

Citations

General sources

External links

 Girlfriends site on HHE Paramount
 Syndication info. on CBS TV Distribution site
 
 

2000 American television series debuts
2008 American television series endings
2000s American black sitcoms
2000s American sex comedy television series
2000s American romantic comedy television series
English-language television shows
Television series by CBS Studios
Television series created by Mara Brock Akil
Television shows set in Los Angeles
The CW original programming
UPN original programming